Jingle All the Way is a 1996 American Christmas family comedy film directed by Brian Levant. It stars Arnold Schwarzenegger and Sinbad as two rival fathers, mattress salesman Howard Langston (Schwarzenegger) and postal worker Myron Larabee (Sinbad), both desperately trying to purchase a Turbo-Man action figure for their respective sons on a last-minute shopping spree on Christmas Eve. The film's title is borrowed from the lyrics of the popular Christmas song "Jingle Bells".

Inspired by real-life Christmas toy sell-outs for such items as Cabbage Patch Kids, the film was written by Randy Kornfield. Producer Chris Columbus rewrote the script, adding in elements of satire about the commercialization of Christmas, and the project was picked up by 20th Century Fox. Delays to Fox's reboot of Planet of the Apes allowed Schwarzenegger to come on board the film, while Columbus opted to cast Sinbad instead of Joe Pesci as Myron. Jingle All the Way was set and filmed in the Twin Cities of Minneapolis and Saint Paul at a variety of locations, including the Mall of America. After five weeks filming, production moved to California where scenes such as the end parade were shot. The film's swift production meant merchandising was limited to a replica of the Turbo-Man action figure used in the film.

Upon release, Jingle All the Way grossed $129 million worldwide and received generally negative reviews from critics. In 2001, Fox was ordered to pay $19 million to Murray Hill Publishing for stealing the idea for the film; the verdict was overturned three years later. Jingle All the Way is the third and final collaboration between Sinbad and Phil Hartman after Coneheads (1993) and Houseguest (1995), and the last film featuring Hartman to be released during his lifetime before his death in 1998. In 2014, the film was followed by a sequel in name only, Jingle All the Way 2, starring Larry the Cable Guy.

Plot
Workaholic Minneapolis mattress salesman Howard Langston loves his wife, Liz, and nine-year-old son, Jamie, but rarely finds time for them. He is often put in a bad light by his neighbor, divorcé Ted Maltin, who harbors unrequited feelings for Liz.  After missing Jamie's karate class graduation, Howard resolves to redeem himself by fulfilling his Christmas wish for a Turbo-Man action figure, a popular television superhero; despite Liz actually having asked him to buy one two weeks earlier, which Howard forgot about. On Christmas Eve, Howard sets out to buy the toy, but finds that every store has sold out, and in the process develops a rivalry with Myron Larabee, a postal worker father with the same goal.

In desperation, Howard attempts to buy a figure from a counterfeit ring run by con men dressed in Santa suits, which results in a massive fight in the warehouse that is broken up by the police. Howard narrowly escapes arrest by posing as an undercover officer.  Exhausted at his failure and out of fuel, Howard goes to a diner and calls home, intending to tell his wife the truth. Jamie answers the phone but keeps reminding him of his promise to be home in time for the annual Holiday Wintertainment Parade. Losing his patience, Howard yells at Jamie, after which he feels guilty and depressed after Jamie scolds him for not keeping his promises.

Howard finds Myron at the diner and they share their experiences over coffee, where Myron tells him of his resentment towards his own father for failing to get him a Johnny Seven OMA for Christmas. During their conversation, Howard and Myron overhear a radio station advertising a competition for a Turbo-Man doll. The ensuing fight between them results in the diner's phone getting damaged, forcing them to race to the radio station on foot, where the DJ tells them that the competition was actually for a Turbo-Man gift certificate. The police are alerted, but Howard and Myron escape after Myron threatens the officers with a seemingly phony letter bomb. Officer Alexander Hummell, whom Howard has run into several times already, investigates the package, only to have it detonate in his face.

Upon returning to his Suburban, Howard finds it stripped by car thieves. He returns home in a tow truck, only to find Ted putting the star on his family's Christmas tree. In retaliation, Howard starts to steal the Turbo-Man doll Ted bought for his son, Johnny, but can't bring himself to do it. Unfortunately, he is caught in the act and left alone while his family goes to the Christmas parade with Ted.

After letting Jamie and Johnny out of the car, Ted attempts to seduce Liz, but she violently rejects him. Meanwhile, remembering his promise to Jamie to go to the parade, Howard decides to attend as well, but runs into Hummell again. The resulting chase leads to Howard hiding inside a storage room, where he is mistaken for the actor portraying Turbo-Man and dresses in the highly technological costume. As Turbo-Man, Howard uses his chance to present a limited-edition action figure to Jamie, but they are confronted by Myron dressed as Turbo-Man's arch-enemy, Dementor.

Despite Howard's pleas for Myron to stop, a long chase ensues, involving a jetpack flight. Myron acquires the toy from Jamie but is cornered by police officers, while Howard saves his son. Howard reveals himself to his family and apologizes for his shortcomings. The police return the toy to Jamie as Myron is arrested, but Jamie decides to give the toy to Myron for his son, proclaiming his father as his true hero. The crowd carries Howard away in celebration, while Myron, Liz and Jamie look on happily.

In a post-credits scene, Howard finishes decorating their Christmas tree later that night by putting the star on top. However, when Liz asks him what he got for her, he shockingly realizes that he forgot to get her a gift.

Cast

Production

Development

The film draws inspiration from the high demand for Christmas toys such as the Cabbage Patch Kids and Mighty Morphin Power Rangers in the late 1980s and early 1990s, which often led to intense searching and occasional violence among shoppers, such as the Cabbage Patch riots, over finding the toys. Randy Kornfield wrote the film's original screenplay after witnessing his in-laws go to a Santa Monica toy store at dawn in order to get his son a Power Ranger. While admitting to missing the clamor for the Cabbage Patch Kids and Power Rangers, producer Chris Columbus experienced a similar situation in 1995 when he attempted to obtain a Buzz Lightyear action figure from the film Toy Story, released that year. As a result, he rewrote Kornfield's script, which was accepted by 20th Century Fox. Columbus was always "attracted to the dark side of the happiest holiday of the year", so wrote elements of the film as a satire of the commercialization of Christmas.

Brian Levant was hired to direct the film. Columbus said Levant "underst[ood] the humor in the material" and "was very animated and excited, and he had a vision of what he wanted to do". Levant said "The story that was important to me was between the father and son ... it's a story about love, and a father's journey to deliver it in the form of a Turbo Man doll. The fact that I got to design a toy line and do the commercials and make pajamas and comic books was fun for me as a filmmaker. But at its root, the movie's about something really sweet. It's about love and building a better family. I think that's consistent with everything I've done."

Arnold Schwarzenegger was quickly cast. He became available in February 1996 after Fox's remake of Planet of the Apes was held up again; Columbus also exited that project to work on Jingle All the Way. The film marks Schwarzenegger's fourth appearance as the lead in a comedy film, following Twins (1988), Kindergarten Cop (1990) and Junior (1994). Schwarzenegger was paid a reported $20 million for the role. He enjoyed the film, having experienced last-minute Christmas shopping himself, and was attracted to playing an "ordinary" character in a family film. Columbus initially wanted Joe Pesci to play Myron. Comedian Sinbad was chosen instead, partly due to his similar height and size to Schwarzenegger. Sinbad was suggested for the part by Schwarzenegger's agent, but the producers felt he was unsuited to the role of a villain as it could harm his clean, family-oriented comedy act and reputation, although Sinbad felt the character would generate the audience's sympathy rather than hate. Furthermore, he missed the audition due to his appearance with First Lady Hillary Clinton and musician Sheryl Crow on the USO tour of Bosnia and Herzegovina, but Columbus waited for him to return to allow him to audition and, although Sinbad felt he had "messed" it up, he was given the part. He improvised the majority of his lines in the film; Schwarzenegger also improvised many of his responses in his conversations with Sinbad's character.

Filming
Filming took place in Minnesota for five weeks from April 15, 1996; at the time, it was the largest film production to ever take place in the state. Jingle All the Way was set and filmed in the Twin Cities metropolitan area of Minnesota at locations such as Bloomington's Mall of America, Mickey's Diner, downtown Minneapolis, Linden Hills, residential areas of Edina and primarily downtown Saint Paul. Unused shops in the Seventh place Mall area were redecorated to resemble Christmas decorated stores, while the Energy Park Studios were used for much of the filming and the Christmas lights stayed up at Rice Park for use in the film. The Mall of America and the state's "semi-wintry weather" proved attractive for the studio. Although Schwarzenegger stated that the locals were "well-behaved" and "cooperative", Levant often found filming "impossible" due to the scale and noise of the crowds who came to watch production, especially in the Mall of America, but overall found the locals to be "respectful" and "lovely people." Levant spent several months in the area before filming in order to prepare. The film uses artistic license by treating Minneapolis and Saint Paul as one city, as this was logistically easier; the police are labeled "Twin Cities Police" in the film. Additionally, the city's Holidazzle Parade is renamed the Wintertainment Parade and takes place on 2nd Avenue during the day, rather than Nicollet Mall at night. Levant wanted to film the parade at night but was overruled for practical reasons.

The parade was filmed at Universal Studios Hollywood in California on the New York Street set, due to safety concerns. The set was designed to resemble 2nd Avenue; the parade was shot from above by helicopters and stitched into matte shots of the real-life street. It took three weeks to film, with 1,500 extras being used in the scene, along with three custom designed floats. Other parts of the film to be shot in Los Angeles, California included store interiors, and the warehouse fight scene between Howard and the criminal Santas, for which a Pasadena furniture warehouse was used. Turbo-Man was created and designed for the film. This meant the commercials and scenes from the Turbo-Man TV series were all shot by Levant, while all of the Turbo-Man merchandise, packaging and props shown in the film were custom made one-offs and designed to look "authentic, as if they all sprang from the same well." Along with Columbus and Levant, production designer Leslie McDonald and character designer Tim Flattery crafted Turbo-Man, Booster and Dementor and helped make the full-size Turbo-Man suit for the film's climax. Principal production finished in August; Columbus "fine-tun[ed] the picture until the last possible minute," using multiple test audiences "to see where the big laughs actually lie."

Music

TVT Records released the film's soundtrack album on Audio CD on November 26, 1996. It features only two of composer David Newman's pieces from Jingle All the Way, but features many of the songs by other artists included in the film, as well as other Christmas songs and new tracks by the Brian Setzer Orchestra. Intrada Music Group released a Special Collection limited edition of Newman's full 23-track score on November 3, 2008.

Release

Marketing
As Schwarzenegger only signed on for the film in February and the film was shot so quickly, only six and a half months were available for merchandising, instead of the ideal year. As such, merchandising was limited to a 13.5-inch replica $25 Talking Turbo-Man action figure and the West Coast exclusive Turbo-Man Time Racer vehicle, while no tie-in promotions could be secured. Despite this, several critics wrote that the film was only being made in order to sell the toy. Columbus dismissed this notion, stating that with only roughly 200,000 Turbo-Man toys being made, the merchandising was far less than the year's other releases, such as Space Jam and 101 Dalmatians. The film's release coincided with the Tickle Me Elmo craze, in which high demand for the doll during the 1996 Christmas season lead to store mobbing similar to that depicted for Turbo-Man.
The world premiere was held on November 16, 1996, at the Mall of America in Bloomington where parts of the film were shot. A day of events was held to celebrate the film's release and Schwarzenegger donated memorabilia from the film to the Mall's Planet Hollywood.

Home media
The film was released on VHS in October 1997, and in November 1998 it was released on DVD. It was rereleased on DVD in December 2004, followed by an extended director's cut in October 2007, known as the "Family Fun Edition". It contained several minutes of extra footage, as well as other DVD extras such as a behind the scenes featurette. In December of the following year, the Family Fun Edition was released on Blu-ray Disc.

Lawsuit
In 1998, Murray Hill Publishing sued 20th Century Fox for $150,000, claiming that the idea for the film was stolen from a screenplay they had purchased from high school teacher Brian Webster entitled Could This Be Christmas? They said the script had 36 similarities with Jingle All the Way, including the plot, dialogue and character names. Murray Hill President Bob Laurel bought the script from Webster in 1993, and sent it to Fox and other studios in 1994 but received no response and claimed the idea was copied by Kornfield, who was Fox's script reader. In 2001, Fox were found guilty of stealing the idea and ordered to pay $19 million ($15 million in damages and $4 million in legal costs) to Murray Hill, with Webster to receive a portion. Laurel died a few months after the verdict, before receiving any of the money. On appeal, the damages figure was lowered to $1.5 million, before the verdict itself was quashed in 2004 after a judge decided the idea was not stolen, as Fox had bought Kornfield's screenplay before he or anybody else at Fox had read Could This Be Christmas?

Reception

Box office
Opening on November 22, Jingle All the Way made $12.1 million in its first weekend, opening at #4 behind Star Trek: First Contact, Space Jam and Ransom; it went on to gross $129 million worldwide, recouping its $75 million budget. The film was released in the United Kingdom on December 6, 1996, and topped the country's box office that weekend.

Critical response

The site's critical consensus reads, "Arnold Schwarzenegger tries his best, but Jingle All the Way suffers from an uneven tone, shifting wildly from a would-be satire on materialism to an antic, slapstick yuk-fest." On Metacritic the film has a score of 34% based on reviews from 23 critics, indicating "generally unfavorable reviews". Audiences polled by CinemaScore gave the film an average grade of "B+" on an A+ to F scale.

Emanuel Levy felt the film "highly formulaic" and criticized Levant's direction as little more advanced than a television sitcom. Although he felt that the script did not provide sufficient opportunity for Hartman, Wilson and Conrad to give exceptional performances, he opined that "Schwarzenegger has developed a light comic delivery, punctuated occasionally by an ironic one-liner," while "Sinbad has good moments". Neil Jeffries of Empire disagreed, feeling Schwarzenegger to be "wooden" and Sinbad to be "trying desperately to be funnier than his hat" but praised Lloyd as the "saving grace" of the film.

The New York Times critic Janet Maslin felt the film lacked any real plot, failed in its attempt at satire, should have included Myron's only mentioned son and "mostly wasted" Hartman, while Levant's direction was "listless". Similarly, the BBC's Neil Smith criticized the film's script, its focus on the commercialization of Christmas, as well as Schwarzenegger's performance which shows "the comic timing of a dead moose," but singled out Hartman for praise. Chicago Tribune critic Michael Wilmington panned the film, wondering why the characters (primarily Howard) acted so illogically: "Howard Langston is supposed to be a successful mattress manufacturer, but the movie paints him as a hot-tempered buffoon without a sensible idea in his head." Jack Garner of USA Today condemned the film, finding it more "cynical" than satirical, stating "this painfully bad movie has been inspired strictly by the potential jingle of cash registers." He wrote of Levant's directorial failure as he "offers no ... sense of comic timing," while "pauses in the midst of much of the dialogue are downright painful." Trevor Johnston suggested that the film "seems to mark a point of decline in the Schwarzenegger career arc" and the anti-consumerism message largely failed, with "Jim Belushi's corrupt mall Santa with his stolen-goods warehouse ... provid[ing] the film's sole flash of dark humour."

IGN's Mike Drucker praised its subject matter as "one of the few holiday movies to directly deal with the commercialization of Christmas" although felt the last twenty minutes of the film let it down, as the first hour or so had "some family entertainment" value if taken with a "grain of salt". He concluded the film was "a member of the so-corny-its-good genre," while "Arnold delivers plenty of one-liners ripe for sound board crank callers." Jamie Malanowski of The New York Times praised the film's satirical premise but felt it was "full of unrealized potential" because "the filmmakers [wrongly] equate mayhem with humor." Roger Ebert gave the film two-and-a-half stars, writing that he "liked a lot of the movie", which he thought had "energy" and humor which would have mass audience appeal. He was, though, disappointed by "its relentlessly materialistic view of Christmas, and by the choice to go with action and (mild) violence over dialogue and plot." Kevin Carr of 7M Pictures concluded that while the film is not very good, as a form of family entertainment it is "surprisingly fun."

Accolades

Sequel

Over 18 years after the release of the original film, a stand-alone sequel, Jingle All the Way 2, was released straight-to-DVD in December 2014. Directed by Alex Zamm and produced by WWE Studios and 20th Century Fox, the film has a similar plot to the original, but is otherwise not connected and has none of the original cast or characters. The lead roles were instead played by Larry the Cable Guy and Santino Marella.

See also
 List of Christmas films
 "Jingle Bells", popular traditional winter holiday song

References

External links
 
 
 
 

1996 films
1990s buddy comedy films
1990s children's comedy films
American buddy comedy films
American children's comedy films
American Christmas comedy films
Films about toys
Films set in Minnesota
Films shot in Minnesota
Films shot in Los Angeles
20th Century Fox films
1492 Pictures films
Films directed by Brian Levant
Films involved in plagiarism controversies
Films produced by Chris Columbus
Films produced by Michael Barnathan
Films scored by David Newman
1990s Christmas comedy films
20th Century Studios franchises
American satirical films
1990s satirical films
1996 comedy films
American superhero films
Films about father–son relationships
1990s English-language films
1990s American films
Films about salespeople